Strange Highways is the sixth  studio album by American heavy metal band Dio. It's also their first album since Ronnie James Dio and Vinny Appice's reunion tour with Black Sabbath. The European release was on Vertigo, in October 1993; the U.S. release was on Reprise Records, in January 1994.

After the short-lived reunion with Black Sabbath for the recording of the album Dehumanizer (1992) and the subsequent tour, Dio and Appice returned to Dio's solo group, hiring Tracy Grijalva as new guitarist. Former Dio bassist Jimmy Bain was to make a return to the band, but he was soon sacked by Dio and replaced by Jeff Pilson. It is considered Dio's heaviest and darkest album.

"Hollywood Black" was demoed by Black Sabbath during the Dehumanizer sessions. "Whether it's the same, I don't know…" Tony Iommi remarked of Dio's version (before hearing it). "Could be the same lyrics – probably is. I wouldn't think he would use the same music."

Track listing
All lyrics written by Ronnie James Dio.

Personnel
Dio
Ronnie James Dio – vocals
Tracy G – guitars
Jeff Pilson – bass, keyboards
Vinny Appice – drums

Production
 Recorded at Rumbo Recorders, Los Angeles, California
 Produced, engineered and mixed by Mike Fraser
 Assistant engineered by Andy Udoff
 Mixed at Record Plant, Los Angeles, California
 Originally mastered by George Marino at Sterling Sound, New York City
 Cover illustration by Wil Rees
 Sigil design and cover artwork by Ed Holding for Mainartery

Charts

References

External links 
Strange Highways song lyrics

1993 albums
Albums produced by Mike Fraser
Dio (band) albums
Reprise Records albums
Vertigo Records albums